Grey divorce or silver splitter, is a term referring to the demographic trend of an increasing divorce rate for older ("grey-haired") couples in long-lasting marriages. Former American vice-presidential couple Tipper and Al Gore's decision to separate after over 40 years of marriage is an example of this trend as is the former married research and writing duo Masters and Johnson and music duo Captain and Tennille, whose own divorce came in 2014 after 39 years of marriage. Another example of this is the divorce of the world's 4th richest man, Bill Gates and his wife of 27 years, Melinda French Gates as of May 2021.

In the United States
Grey divorce was documented in the United States as early as the 1980s, but wasn't labeled as such until around 2004. The phenomenon entered the public awareness with a 2004 AARP study and was further elucidated in Deirdre Bair's 2007 book Calling It Quits containing interviews with grey divorcees. Older couples are responsible for the overall increase in the divorce rate in the United Kingdom. While wives seek divorces at a higher rate than husbands, some have argued that an increase in older husbands' infidelity, facilitated by the development and increased availability of nitrate-based anti-impotence drugs such as Viagra, Cialis, and Levitra, has led to the divorce increase, though this account has also been disputed. Other researchers have pointed to the increase in human longevity, the cultural values of Baby Boomers, and women's increasing financial independence as potential causes.

Statistics on grey divorce

In May 2004, the AARP conducted a study titled The Divorce Experience: A Study of Divorce at Midlife and Beyond.

Some of the findings consisted of:

Who initiates divorce in later life?

66% of female participants initiated divorce
41% of male participants initiated divorce

Participants' age when divorced
Age 40–49, 73% of participants divorced in their 40s
Age 50–59, 22% of participants divorced in their 50s
Age 60 and older, 4% of participants divorced in their 60s or later

In Japan

While devoting years to his career, a husband may rarely see his family. As a result, a husband and wife may not interact extensively. When the husband retires, both can feel they are living with a virtual stranger. This can cause particular stress for the woman who, as society dictated in her youth, is now expected to attend to her husband's every need. The stress of change in lifestyle brings a number of problems, including feelings of resentment towards husbands.

See also
Baby Boom Generation
Mid-life crisis

References

Further reading
 

Divorce
Old age